The General Tire 125 is a ARCA Menards Series East race held annually at Dover Motor Speedway, Prior to 2020, it was the final race of the season and was held before the NASCAR Xfinity Series event, the Use Your Melon Drive Sober 200.

Past winners

 2001, 2004, 2006, 2010–2012, and 2016–2017: Race extended due to a NASCAR Overtime finish.
 2015 and 2018: Race postponed from Friday to Saturday due to rain.

References

External links
 

ARCA Menards Series East